Erik Harald Zetterström (14 August 1904 – 7 July 1997), better known by his screen name Kar de Mumma, was a Swedish humorous writer and playwright. His pen name can be read as Car da Mon in Swedish.

In the 1920s and 1930s, he wrote many of the most appreciated Swedish revues. 1956–1978, the revues he wrote for Folkan (Folk-theater) in Stockholm (among them the Kar de Mumma revue) became an institution on the Swedish theatre scene.

He was one of the most appreciated Swedish humor columnists, writing for Svenska Dagbladet from 1922 until the mid-1990s. For thirty years he would publish an annual book with lighthearted columns, memories and thoughts in the fall.

Notes

External links 
 

1904 births
1997 deaths
Writers from Stockholm
Swedish-language writers
Swedish male writers